Euthanasia in the Netherlands is regulated by the "Termination of Life on Request and Assisted Suicide (Review Procedures) Act" which was passed in 2001 and took effect in 2002. It states that euthanasia and physician-assisted suicide are not punishable if the attending physician acts in accordance with criteria of due care. These criteria concern the patient's request, the patient's suffering (unbearable and hopeless), the information provided to the patient, the absence of reasonable alternatives, consultation of another physician and the applied method of ending life. To demonstrate their compliance, the Act requires physicians to report euthanasia to a review committee.

Legal framework
The legal debate concerning euthanasia in the Netherlands took off with the "Postma case" in 1973, concerning a physician who had facilitated the death of her mother following repeated explicit requests for euthanasia. While the physician was convicted, the court's judgment set out criteria when a doctor would not be required to keep a patient alive contrary to their will. This set of criteria was formalised in the course of a number of court cases during the 1980s.

Termination of Life on Request and Assisted Suicide (Review Procedures) Act was passed in April 2001 and took effect on 1 April 2002. It legalises euthanasia and physician-assisted suicide in very specific cases, under very specific circumstances. The law was proposed by Els Borst, the D66 minister of Health. The procedures codified in the law had been a convention of the Dutch medical community for over twenty years.

The law allows medical review board to suspend prosecution of doctors who performed euthanasia when each of the following conditions are fulfilled:
 the patient's suffering is unbearable with no prospect of improvement
 the patient's request for euthanasia must be voluntary and persist over time (the request cannot be granted when under the influence of others, psychological illness or drugs)
 the patient must be fully aware of his/her condition, prospects, and options
 there must be consultation with at least one other independent doctor who needs to confirm the conditions mentioned above
 the death must be carried out in a medically appropriate fashion by the doctor or patient, and the doctor must be present
 the patient is at least 12 years old (patients between 12 and 16 years of age require the consent of their parents)

The doctor must also report the cause of death to the municipal coroner in accordance with the relevant provisions of the Burial and Cremation Act. A regional review committee assesses whether a case of termination of life on request or assisted suicide complies with the due care criteria. Depending on its findings, the case will either be closed or, if the conditions are not met, brought to the attention of the Public Prosecutor. Finally, the legislation offers an explicit recognition of the validity of a written declaration of will of the patient regarding euthanasia (a "euthanasia directive"). Such declarations can be used when a patient is in a coma or otherwise unable to state if they wish to be euthanised.

Euthanasia remains a criminal offense in cases not meeting the law's specific conditions, with the exception of several situations that are not subject to the restrictions of the law at all, because they are not considered euthanasia but normal medical practice:
 stopping or not starting a medically useless (futile) treatment
 stopping or not starting a treatment at the patient's request
 speeding up death as a side-effect of treatment necessary for alleviating serious suffering

Euthanasia of children under the age of 12 remains technically illegal; however, Dr. Eduard Verhagen has documented several cases and, together with colleagues and prosecutors, has developed a protocol to be followed in those cases. Prosecutors will refrain from pressing charges if this Groningen Protocol is followed.

Practice
In 2016 the number of official cases of euthanasia in the Netherlands was 6,091 which was 4 % of total deaths in the Netherlands.

In 2010, the number had been 4,050, and according to research done by the Vrije Universiteit, University Medical Center Utrecht and Statistics Netherlands, and published in The Lancet, that was not more than before the "Termination of Life on Request and Assisted Suicide (Review Procedures) Act" took effect in 2002; and the study concluded that In effect, the legislation did not lead to more cases of euthanasia and assisted suicide on request.

In 2003, in the Netherlands, 1,626 cases were officially reported of euthanasia in the sense of a physician assisting the death (1.2 % of all deaths). Usually the sedative sodium thiopental is intravenously administered to induce a coma. Once it is certain that the patient is in a deep coma, typically after less than a minute, pancuronium is administered to stop breathing and cause death.

Officially reported were also 148 cases of physician-assisted dying (0.14 % of all deaths), usually by drinking a strong (10 g) barbiturate potion. The doctor is required to be present for two reasons:
 to make sure the potion is not taken by a different person, by accident (or, theoretically, for "unauthorised" suicide or perhaps even murder)
 to monitor the process and be available to apply the combined procedure mentioned below, if necessary

In two cases the doctor was reprimanded for not being present while the patient drank the potion. They said they had not realised that this was required.

Forty-one cases were reported to combine the two procedures: usually in these cases the patient drinks the potion, but this does not cause death. After a few hours, or earlier in the case of vomiting, the muscle relaxant is administered to cause death.

By far, most reported cases concerned cancer patients. Also, in most cases the procedure was applied at home.

A study in 2000 found that Dutch physicians who intend to provide assistance with suicide sometimes end up administering a lethal medication themselves because of the patient's inability to take the medication or because of problems with the completion of physician-assisted suicide.

In 2010 there were 3,136 cases reported of a physician assisting the death of a patient. When categorised there were, 2,910 cases of "end of life on request", 182 cases of assisted suicide, and in 44 cases it was a combination. The evaluation commissions decided that in 9 cases the procedures were not according to protocol and referred the cases to the Public Prosecution Service and the Health Care Inspectorate. The number of reported cases was rising by 8 % each year. In 2017, the number of reported euthanasias had increased to 6,585;  99.8 % of them being performed carefully. The reason for this rise is not clear.

Further developments
Under current Dutch law, euthanasia by doctors is only legal in cases of "hopeless and unbearable" suffering. In practice this means that it is limited to those suffering from serious medical conditions like severe pain, exhaustion or asphyxia. Sometimes, psychiatric patients that have proven to be untreatable, can get euthanasia. There is much discussion   about people with early dementia who have previously stated in a written will that if they ever got dementia, they would want to get euthanasia.

In February 2010 a citizens' initiative called Out of Free Will further demanded that all Dutch people over 70 who feel tired of life should have the right to professional help in ending it. The organisation started collecting signatures in support of this proposed change in Dutch legislation. A number of prominent Dutch citizens supported the initiative, including former ministers and artists, legal scholars and physicians. However, this initiative has never been legalised.

In 2016, the Dutch Health Minister of the Second Rutte cabinet announced plans to draft a law that would allow assisted suicide in cases without a terminal illness, if the person feels they have completed life.

Foreign views

In 2012, United States Republican presidential candidate Rick Santorum claimed that forced euthanasia accounted for 5% of all deaths in the Netherlands and that elderly Dutch people wear a bracelet reading “Do not euthanize me.”, but these claims have been disproven. The lack of a formal statement by Dutch officials on the matter angered Dutch politician Frans Timmermans, who demanded minister of foreign affairs Uri Rosenthal to take a public stance against such assertions.

The 2019 suicide of 17-year-old Noa Pothoven led to false reports in English-language media that she had been granted an assisted death.

References

External links

Dutch Assisted Suicide & Euthanasia Annual Reports in English, German, French and Dutch.
The troubled 29-year-old helped to die by Dutch doctors - BBC News. Published 9 August 2018.

 
Health law in the Netherlands
Society of the Netherlands